Nikola Radmanovac (born 30 January 1997) is a Serbian football defender who plays for Russian club Baltika Kaliningrad.

Club career

Napredak Kruševac
Born in Kruševac, Radmanovac passed the Napredak Kruševac youth school. He has joined the first team for the 2014–15 season, but he stayed with U19 selection until 2016. Previously, he signed a two-year scholarship contract with club in summer 2015. He made his senior debut in 25 fixture match of 2015–16 Serbian First League season, against Kolubara, replacing Bohdan Sichkaruk in 71 minute of the match. After Miloš Vulić was substituted out in the second half the last match of the 2015–16 Serbian First League season, Radmanovac spent the rest of match as a team captain. In summer 2016, Radmanovac was loaned to Serbian League East side Prva Petoletka for a one-year dual registration, which was terminated after 6 months. He also spent the spring half-season as a loaned player with Brodarac 1947. In summer 2017, Radmanovac signed a two-year professional contract with Napredak, after which he moved on loan deal to Bežanija. At the beginning 2018, Radmanovac returned to Napredak. In mid season of the 2017–18 campaign, Radmanovac moved on loan to the local club Trayal until the end of the 2017–18 campaign in the Serbian League East.

Russia
On 16 June 2022, Radmanovac signed with Russian Football National League side Baltika Kaliningrad for the term of 3 years with an option for fourth year.

Career statistics

Honours
Napredak Kruševac
Serbian First League: 2015–16

References

External links
 
 
 

1997 births
Living people
Sportspeople from Kruševac
Association football defenders
Serbian footballers
Serbia youth international footballers
FK Napredak Kruševac players
FK Bežanija players
FK Trayal Kruševac players
FK Radnik Surdulica players
FC Baltika Kaliningrad players
Serbian First League players
Serbian SuperLiga players
Russian First League players
Serbian expatriate footballers
Expatriate footballers in Russia
Serbian expatriate sportspeople in Russia